Claude Lamoral, Prince of Ligne (7 August 1685 – Chateau de Beloeil, 7 April 1766) was a Field marshal and sixth Prince in the House of Ligne.

A state councilor, he reorganized the army in the newly conquered Austrian Netherlands, and in 1720 took possession in the name of the Emperor of the fortified cities of Tournai, Ypres and Menen. This voyage through Flanders and Hainaut was accompanied by great pomp and celebration, many Te Deums and numerous receptions in every city.

But arguably his greatest achievement is the domain of Belœil. He spent millions to give the castle and its gardens the splendour they have today. Prince Claude-Lamoral tried to rival Versailles of Louis XIV, and employed the Parisian architect Jean-Michel Chevotet, grand architecture connaisseur at the time.

Prince Claude-Lamoral married Elisabeth Alexandrine de Salm, daughter of Louis Otto, Prince of Salm, and was father of Charles-Joseph, 7th Prince of Ligne, Louise (1728–1784), and Marie (1730–1783).

References 

1685 births
1766 deaths
06
06
Field marshals of Austria
Military personnel of the Austrian Netherlands
Knights of the Golden Fleece of Austria